Luke Ryan Jackson (born November 6, 1981) is an American former professional basketball player in the National Basketball Association (NBA). He played college basketball for the Oregon Ducks, earning consensus second-team All-American  honors as a senior in 2004. He was selected by the Cleveland Cavaliers in the first round of the 2004 NBA draft with the 10th overall pick. After his playing career, Jackson was a head coach for the Northwest Christian University Beacons.

High school and college career
A four-year letterman in both basketball and baseball at Creswell High School, he was Oregon's Class AAA Basketball Player of the Year in 1998 and 2000. He averaged 24.2 points, 8.1 assists and 5.0 steals per game as a senior to help Creswell win the 2000 Oregon State Basketball Championship (Class AAA). He finished his career ranked fourth all-time in Oregon high school history, with 2,095 points.

Jackson continued his on court success with a storied four-season career at the University of Oregon, leading the Ducks to an Elite Eight finish in 2002 NCAA tournament as a sophomore. Among his teammates at Oregon were future NBA players Luke Ridnour and Fred Jones.

Jackson is the only men's basketball player in school history to place in the top ten in nine different statistical categories. He is second all-time in points scored, third in total steals, fourth in assists and seventh in rebounds and is first in free throws made. Jackson is one of two Pac-10 players to score over 1,900 points, grab over 700 rebounds and contribute over 400 assists over their career. In one of the greatest individual performances of all-time at Mac Court, Jackson scored 40 points – including 29 straight in the second half and overtime – as Oregon overcame an 18-point deficit to defeat Colorado 77–72 in the first round of the National Invitation Tournament on March 17, 2004. He also became only the second freshman in Pac-10 history to record a triple-double when on February 17, 2001, he added 14 points, 11 rebounds and ten assists in a contest versus Washington. In his junior year, Jackson's second and final career triple-doubles against Florida A&M made him only the third Pac-10 player in history to achieve multiple career triple-doubles (joining Jason Kidd and Loren Woods).

Named to the Pac-10 All-Freshman Team in 2000–01, Pac-10 honorable mention in 2001–02, and All-Pac-10 in 2002–03 and 2003–04, he also garnered All-American honors from The Sporting News, Basketball Times, ESPN.com and CBS SportsLine.com.

His senior campaign saw the lanky swingman lead Oregon in points (21.2), rebounds (7.2) and assists (4.5) while becoming a finalist for the John R. Wooden Award and Naismith College Player of the Year award. Jackson graduated from the University of Oregon with a degree in political science.

Professional career
While he was selected by Cleveland with the tenth pick overall of the 2004 NBA Draft, his playing time with the Cavaliers was limited to only 46 games over his first two NBA seasons, missing 32 games in the second season with a broken left wrist. That Fall, Cleveland traded Jackson, along with an undisclosed amount of cash, to the Boston Celtics in return for center Dwayne Jones; Jackson was waived before the 2006–07 season started on October 27.

Recovered from his injuries, Jackson signed with the Idaho Stampede of the NBDL. Jackson averaged 12.5 points, 2.3 rebounds and 3.2 assists in 30.8 minutes in six games with Idaho, gaining the attention of the injury rattled Los Angeles Clippers. He signed to a 10-day contract in January 2007 with the Clippers, but his stay in Los Angeles was brief, appearing in only three games.

On March 25, 2007, Jackson was signed to a 10-day contract by the Toronto Raptors to provide bench depth. After performing well in limited minutes, he was signed to a second ten-day contract and then to a two-year pact with Toronto for the rest of the 2006–2007 NBA season, and the 2007–08 season as well. On April 18, 2007, in Toronto's last game of the regular season, Jackson exploded for a career-high 30 points and 5 assists while logging a career maximum 39 minutes in a defeat to the Philadelphia 76ers.

On October 29, 2007, Jackson was waived by the Raptors.  He was reacquired by the Idaho Stampede on December 4, 2007. In his first game with that club (the only one that season), he scored 30 points in 31 minutes with 7–14 shooting, including 11–11 at the free throw line and 5–6 from long range. He also had 4 rebounds, 9 assists, 1 steal, 1 blocked shot, 3 turnovers, and 0 personal fouls. He then left the team for a workout with the Miami Heat.

On December 12, 2007, the Heat released Penny Hardaway to clear a roster spot for Jackson. During his stay in Miami, Jackson averaged 5.6 points, 2.4 rebounds and 1.2 assists. He was waived by the Miami Heat on February 6, 2008. This last stint in Miami ended up being Jackson's last playing days in the NBA for the rest of his professional basketball career. His final game was played on February 1, 2008 in a 85 - 94 loss to the New Jersey Nets where he recorded 10 points, 5 rebounds and 1 steal.

Jackson was signed by the Portland Trail Blazers in August 2008, but was released so the Blazers could keep under the 15-player limit.

Jackson re-signed with the Idaho Stampede in December 2008. He was named to the 2009 NBDL All-Star Game on February 3, 2009.

Jackson played with the Dallas Mavericks summer league team in 2009. On August 12, 2009, he moved to Italy and signed a one-year contract with Carife Ferrara.

Jackson was invited to the Memphis Grizzlies preseason camp in September 2010, but was waived on October 10.

Jackson later rejoined the Idaho Stampede. In 2011, Jackson was signed by Hapoel Jerusalem B.C. from the Israeli Basketball Super League.

Coaching
On February 20, 2013, Jackson was introduced as the new head coach at Northwest Christian University, in Eugene, Oregon, replacing Corey Anderson. During his first season at the helm of the Beacons, Jackson led his team to their first ever appearance in the NAIA Division II National Championship Tournament.  In four seasons as coach of the Beacons, Jackson led the team to an 88-38 record, two conference regular season titles, and three NAIA Division II tournament appearances.

NBA career averages

Career highlights and awards
College
 2004 NCAA Men's Basketball All-American
NBA/NBA D-League
 NBA D-League All-Star (2009–10)
 Led NBA D-League in 3-Point Pct. (2006–07)
 NBA D-League champion (2008)

Head coaching record

NAIA

References

External links
Northwest Christian coaching bio

D-League profile

1981 births
Living people
All-American college men's basketball players
American expatriate basketball people in Canada
American expatriate basketball people in Israel
American expatriate basketball people in Italy
American men's basketball players
Basketball players at the 2003 Pan American Games
Basketball players from Oregon
Cleveland Cavaliers draft picks
Cleveland Cavaliers players
College men's basketball head coaches in the United States
Hapoel Jerusalem B.C. players
Idaho Stampede players
Los Angeles Clippers players
Miami Heat players
Oregon Ducks men's basketball players
People from Creswell, Oregon
Shooting guards
Small forwards
Sportspeople from Eugene, Oregon
Toronto Raptors players
Pan American Games competitors for the United States